Nature contre nature is a French telefilm comedy, broadcast in 2004, directed by Lucas Belvaux, and scripted by Lucas Belvaux with Jean-Luc Gaget.

Plot
Sébastien Chantoux, (Lucas Belvaux),  a psychoanalyst, leaves Paris and goes to live in the Creuse, at Royère-de-Vassivière. Hardly settled, he discovers "Troc'En Creuse",  a system of local exchange that operates through the use of barter. Initially reticent about using it and bartering his psychoanalytic sessions, he is reconciled to the system, and in a few weeks  becomes a figure in the community. Everything seems to be working out, and without costing Sébastien a sou, until the arrival of Mlle. Oudinot, (Catherine Mouchet),  a tax inspector. War is declared; "Troc'En Creuse" and the small local economy against the capitalism of the state.

External links 
 

French comedy films
2005 television films
2005 films
Films directed by Lucas Belvaux
2004 films
2000s French films